|}

See also
 List of memorials to Franklin D. Roosevelt
 Presidential memorials in the United States

References

Franklin D. Roosevelt
Roosevelt, Franklin D.